Stanley de Alwis (26 February 1936 – September 2019) was a cricketer who played first-class cricket for Ceylon between 1958 and 1960.

An opening bowler, de Alwis took 4 for 20 on his first-class debut in the Gopalan Trophy match in 1957–58. He gave up sport in 1961 at the age of 25 after contracting hepatitis.

He later worked at the Prisons Department and then at the People's Bank. He died in Colombo in September 2019. He and his wife, who predeceased him by about 20 years, had two daughters.

References

External links

1936 births
2019 deaths
Sri Lankan cricketers
All-Ceylon cricketers
Alumni of Prince of Wales' College, Moratuwa
Sportspeople from Moratuwa